Hypselodoris whitei is a colourful species of sea slug or dorid nudibranch, a marine gastropod mollusk in the family Chromodorididae.

Distribution
This nudibranch was described from Caramata Passage between Sumatra and Borneo. It is reported from the Tropical Western Pacific from Australia to Hawaii.

Description
Hypselodoris whitei has a yellow body with purple longitudinal lines, and a purple bordered mantle. The gills and rhinophores are bright orange tipped with white. It is very similar in appearance to Hypselodoris maridadilus but that species lacks the white-tipped rhinophores and gills. This species can reach a total length of at least 40 mm and feeds on sponges.

References

External links
 

Chromodorididae
Gastropods described in 1850